Santana is the debut studio album by American Latin rock band Santana. It was released on August 22, 1969. Over half of the album's length is composed of instrumental music, recorded by what was originally a purely free-form jam band. At the suggestion of manager Bill Graham, the band took to writing more conventional songs for more impact, but managed to retain the essence of improvisation in the music.

The album was destined to be a major release, given a boost by the band's  performance at the Woodstock Festival earlier that August. The album's first single, "Jingo", was only a modest performer, spending eight weeks on the chart and reaching #56; however, "Evil Ways", the second single taken from the album, was a U.S. Top 10 hit, reaching #9 and spending thirteen weeks on the chart. The album spent more than two years (108 weeks) on the Billboard 200 pop album chart and peaked at #4 in November 1969. It also reached #26 on the UK Albums Chart. It has been mixed and released in both stereo and quadraphonic. The album cover features artwork by Lee Conklin.

Critical reception

In a contemporary review for Rolling Stone, Langdon Winner panned Santana as "a masterpiece of hollow techniques" and "a speed freak's delight - fast, pounding, frantic music with no real content". He compared the music's effect to methedrine, which "gives a high with no meaning", finding Rolie and Santana's playing repetitively unimaginative, amidst a monotony of incompetent rhythms and inconsequential lyrics. Village Voice critic Robert Christgau shared Winner's sentiment in his "unreconstructed opposition to the methedrine school of American music. A lot of noise".

A retrospective Rolling Stone review was more enthusiastic, finding Santana "thrilling ... with ambition, soul and absolute conviction - every moment played straight from the heart". In 2003, the magazine ranked Santana number 150 on their list of the 500 greatest albums of all time, moving up to 149 in a 2012 revised list. Colin Larkin deemed it an excellent example of Latin rock in his Encyclopedia of Popular Music (2011).

Track listing

1998 reissue
Writing credits and songs' lengths are in accord with album's inner notes.

2004 Legacy Edition

Note: Tracks 10–12 are from the studio sessions for the album recorded in May 1969.

Note: Tracks 1–6 are from the original studio sessions for the album recorded January 27–29, 1969.

Personnel
 Carlos Santana – guitar, backing vocals
 David Brown – bass guitar
 Gregg Rolie – lead vocals, Hammond organ, piano
 Michael Shrieve – drums
 Michael Carabello – congas, percussion
 José "Chepito" Areas – timbales, congas, percussion

Production
 Brent Dangerfield and Santana band – producers
 David Brown – engineer
 Lee Conklin – album cover art
 David Rubinson – producer (original first session January 27–29, 1969)

Charts

Certifications

References

External links 
 Santana - Santana (1969) album releases & credits at Discogs.com
 Santana - Santana (1969) album review by Rovi Staff, credits, releases and Billboard charts at AllMusic.com

Santana (band) albums
1969 debut albums
Columbia Records albums
Albums produced by Carlos Santana
Columbia Records live albums
2004 live albums
Santana (band) live albums